The Big Soul-Band (also released as Wade in the Water) is an album by the Johnny Griffin Orchestra, led by jazz saxophonist Johnny Griffin, featuring arrangements by Norman Simmons. It was released on the Riverside label in 1960.

Track listing
"Wade in the Water" (Traditional) - 3:50 Bonus track on CD reissue
"Wade in the Water" - 3:46
"Panic Room Blues" (Norman Simmons) - 4:36
"Nobody Knows the Trouble I've Seen" (Traditional) - 2:43
"Meditation" (Simmons) - 8:21
"Holla" (Simmons) - 3:38
"So Tired" (Bobby Timmons) - 6:38
"Deep River" (Traditional) - 5:28
"Jubilation" (Junior Mance) - 3:57

Tracks 1, 2, 3 and 8 recorded on May 24, 1960; 6, 7 and 9 on May 31; tracks 4-5 recorded on June 3, 1960.

Personnel
Johnny Griffin - tenor saxophone
Clark Terry, Bob Bryant - trumpet
Julian Priester, Matthew Gee - trombone
Pat Patrick - alto sax (#1, 2, 3, 8)
Frank Strozier - alto sax (#4, 5, 6, 7, 9)
Edwin Williams - tenor sax
Charles Davis - baritone sax
Harold Mabern - piano (all tracks except #5)
Bobby Timmons - piano (#5), celeste (#4)
Bob Cranshaw - bass (#1, 2, 3, 8)
Victor Sproles - bass (#4, 5, 6, 7, 9)
Charlie Persip - drums
Norman Simmons - arranger

References 

1960 albums
Johnny Griffin albums
Riverside Records albums
Albums produced by Orrin Keepnews